Illanes (and Yllanes) is a Spanish-origin surname, appearing in the names of:
 Alejandro Mario Yllanes (1913–1960), Bolivian painter
 Héctor Noguera (b. 1937), full name Héctor Eugenio Noguera Illanes, Chilean actor
 José María Merchán (b. 1976), full name José María Merchán Illanes, Spanish triathlete
 Juan Pedro Yllanes (b. 1960), Spanish politician and former judge
 Julio Alberto Mercado Illanes (1920–1994), Chilean businessman and politician
 Marcos Vales (b. 1975), full name Marcos Vales Illanes, Spanish footballer
 Pablo Illanes (b. 1973), Chilean scriptwriter 
 Rodolfo Illanes (1960–2016), Bolivian politician

Spanish-language surnames